
Baishi Mountain, also known by its Chinese name Baishishan, is a mountain in Laiyuan County, Baoding Prefecture, Hebei Province, China. Parts of the Great Wall snake around its foothills.

Background
Its name refers to the white marble making up parts of its bedrock.

The same area was declared the  when it was named a world geological park by UNESCO in September 2006. The CNTA declared it a AAAAA-level tourist attraction in early 2017. It is particularly well known for its appearance during overcast days, when the tops of nearby peaks can be seen jutting out from within low-lying clouds and mist. There is also a regional tourism campaign aimed at promoting the mountain as a spot for lovers.

The spider species Clubiona baishishan takes its name from its discovery near the mountain.

See also
 List of mountains in the People's Republic of China
 List of AAAAA-rated tourist attractions in the People's Republic of China

Notes

References

External links
 Laiyuan County's official map of the Baishi Scenic Area
 Photos of Baishi Mountain from China Daily: 1, 2
 Photos of Baishan Mountain at Xinhua Net
 The glass bridge at Xinhua Net

Mountains of China
AAAAA-rated tourist attractions